Pitakpong Kulasuwan, is a Thai professional footballer who plays as a right back for Thai League 3 club Mahasarakham.

Honours

Club
Muangthong United
 Thai League Cup (1): 2017
 Thailand Champions Cup (1): 2017
 Mekong Club Championship (1): 2017

References

External links
Pitakpong Kulasuwan profile at Muangthong United website

1988 births
Living people
Pitakpong Kulasuwan
Pitakpong Kulasuwan
Association football defenders
Pitakpong Kulasuwan
Pitakpong Kulasuwan
Pitakpong Kulasuwan
Pitakpong Kulasuwan
Pitakpong Kulasuwan
Pitakpong Kulasuwan